Andorra has  of borders, bordering Spain and France.

Borders

Andorra-France border 

The Andorran border with France is 57 kilometres long, and extends through the north and east of the country.

Andorra-Spain border 

The Andorran border with Spain is 64 kilometres long, and extends through the south and west of the country.

Crossing points

References